Dave Thomson (February 14, 1943) is a Scottish former footballer who played as a midfielder.

Career 
Thomson played in the American Soccer League in 1968 with Rochester Lancers. He returned to play with Rochester for the 1969 season. In 1970, the Lancers joined the North American Soccer League, and Thomson continued playing with the team. The following season he was traded to Toronto Metros. In 1973, Toronto released him from his contract.

He would subsequently sign with Toronto Hungaria in the National Soccer League along with former Metros teammate John Fahy. In his debut season with Hungaria he assisted in securing the double (NSL Championship & NSL Cup). He re-signed with Toronto Hungaria for the 1974 season. In 1977, he was named to the Rochester Lancers Team of the Decade.

References  

Living people
1943 births
Scottish footballers
Association football midfielders
Rochester Lancers (1967–1980) players
Toronto Blizzard (1971–1984) players
American Soccer League (1933–1983) players
North American Soccer League (1968–1984) players
Canadian National Soccer League players